Oikophobia (Greek:  + ; related to domatophobia and ecophobia) is an aversion to a home environment, or an abnormal fear (phobia) of one's home. 

In psychiatry, the term is also more narrowly used to indicate a phobia of the contents of a house: "fear of household appliances, equipment, bathtubs, household chemicals, and other common objects in the home." In contrast, domatophobia specifically refers to the fear of a house itself. 

The term has been used in political contexts to refer critically to political ideologies that are held to repudiate one's own culture and laud others. One prominent such usage was by Roger Scruton in his 2004 book England and the Need for Nations.

In 1808, poet and essayist Robert Southey used the word to describe a desire (particularly by the English) to leave home and travel. Southey's usage as a synonym for wanderlust was picked up by other 19th-century writers.

In psychiatry
In psychiatric usage, oikophobia may narrowly refer to fear of the physical space of the home interior, where it is especially linked to the fear of household appliances, baths, electrical equipment, and other aspects of the home perceived to be potentially dangerous. In this psychiatric context, the term is properly applied to fear of the objects within the house, whereas the fear of the house itself is referred to as domatophobia. 

In the post-World War II era, some commentators used the term to refer to a supposed "fear and loathing of housework" experienced by women who worked outside of the home and who were attracted to a consumerist lifestyle.

Political usage 
In his 2004 book England and the Need for Nations, British philosopher Roger Scruton adapted the word to mean "the repudiation of inheritance and home". He argues that it is "a stage through which the adolescent mind normally passes", but that it is a feature of some, typically leftist, political impulses and ideologies that espouse xenophilia, i.e. preference for foreign cultures.

Scruton uses the term as the antithesis of xenophobia. In his book, Roger Scruton: Philosopher on Dover Beach, Mark Dooley describes oikophobia as centered within the Western academic establishment on "both the common culture of the West, and the old educational curriculum that sought to transmit its humane values." This disposition has grown out of, for example, the writings of Jacques Derrida and of Michel Foucault's "assault on 'bourgeois' society result[ing] in an 'anti-culture' that took direct aim at holy and sacred things, condemning and repudiating them as oppressive and power-ridden." He continues:Derrida is a classic oikophobe in so far as he repudiates the longing for home that the Western theological, legal, and literary traditions satisfy.... Derrida's deconstruction seeks to block the path to this 'core experience' of membership, preferring instead a rootless existence founded 'upon nothing.'
An extreme aversion to the sacred, and the thwarting of the connection of the sacred to the culture of the West is described as the underlying motif of oikophobia; and not the substitution of Judeo-Christianity by another coherent system of belief. The paradox of the oikophobe seems to be that any opposition directed at the theological and cultural tradition of the West is to be encouraged even if it is "significantly more parochial, exclusivist, patriarchal, and ethnocentric." Scruton describes "a chronic form of oikophobia [which] has spread through the American universities, in the guise of political correctness."

Scruton's usage has been taken up by some U.S. political commentators to refer to what they see as a rejection of traditional U.S. culture by the liberal elite. In August 2010, James Taranto wrote a column in the Wall Street Journal entitled "Oikophobia: Why the liberal elite finds Americans revolting", in which he criticizes supporters of the proposed Islamic center in New York as oikophobes who were defending Muslims and aimed to "exploit the 9/11 atrocity."

In the Netherlands, the term oikophobia has been adopted by politician and writer Thierry Baudet, which he describes in his book, Oikophobia: The Fear of Home.

Southey's usage
In his Letters from England (1808), Robert Southey describes oikophobia as a product of "a certain state of civilisation or luxury." referring to the habit among wealthy people to visit spa towns and seaside resorts in the summer months. He also mentions the fashion for picturesque travel to wild landscapes, such as the highlands of Scotland.

Southey's link of oikophobia to wealth and the search for new experiences was taken up by other writers, and cited in dictionaries. A writer in 1829 published an essay about his experience witnessing the aftermath of the Battle of Waterloo, saying:[T]he love of locomotion is so natural to an Englishman, that nothing can chain him home, but the absolute impossibility of living abroad. No such imperious necessity acting upon me, I gave way to my oiko-phobia, and the summer of 1815 found me in Brussels.In 1959, Anglo-Egyptian author Bothaina Abd el-Hamid Mohamed used Southey's concept in his book Oikophobia: or, A literary craze for education through travel.

See also
Nostophobia – fear of returning home
Allophilia
Clientitis
Cultural cringe
Wanderlust
Xenocentrism
Xenophily
List of phobias

References 

Phobias